Silica gel is an amorphous and porous form of silicon dioxide (silica), consisting of an irregular tridimensional framework of alternating silicon and oxygen atoms with nanometer-scale voids and pores.  The voids may contain water or some other liquids, or may be filled by gas or vacuum.  In the last case, the material is properly called silica xerogel.

Silica xerogel with an average pore size of 2.4 nanometers has a strong affinity for water molecules and is widely used as a desiccant.  It is hard and translucent, but considerably softer than massive silica glass or quartz; and remains hard when saturated with water.

Silica xerogel is usually commercialized as coarse granules or beads, a few millimeters in diameter. Some grains may contain small amounts of indicator substance that changes color when they have absorbed some water.  Small paper envelopes containing silica xerogel pellets, usually with a "do not eat" warning, are often included in dry food packages to absorb any humidity that might cause spoilage of the food.

'Wet' silica gel, as may be freshly prepared from alkali silicate solutions, may vary in consistency from a soft transparent gel, similar to gelatin or agar, to a hard solid, namely a water-logged xerogel.  It is sometimes used in laboratory processes, for example to suppress convection in liquids or prevent settling of suspended particles.

History 
Silica gel was in existence as early as the 1640s as a scientific curiosity. It was used in World War I for the adsorption of vapors and gases in gas mask canisters. The synthetic route for producing silica gel was patented in 1918 by Walter A. Patrick, a chemistry professor at Johns Hopkins University.

In World War II, silica gel was indispensable in the war effort for keeping penicillin dry, protecting military equipment from moisture damage, as a fluid cracking catalyst for the production of high octane gasoline, making carbon disulphide, and as a catalyst support for the manufacture of butadiene from ethanol (feedstock for synthetic rubber production).

Types 

Silica alumina gel - light yellow, chemically stable, flame-resistant, insoluble except in alkali or hydrofluoric acid. Superficial polarity, thermal stability, performance greater than fine-pored silica gel.

Stabilizing silica gel - non-crystalline micro-porous solid powder, nontoxic, flame-resisting, used in brewery of grains for beer to improve taste, clearness, color, and foam and for removal of non-micro-organism impurities.

Properties 
Silica gel's high specific surface area (around ) allows it to adsorb water readily, making it useful as a desiccant (drying agent). Silica gel is often described as "absorbing" moisture, which may be appropriate when the gel's microscopic structure is ignored, as in silica gel packs or other products. However, material silica gel removes moisture by adsorption onto the surface of its numerous pores rather than by absorption into the bulk of the gel. 

Silica gel is able to adsorb up to 37% of its own weight in moisture in high humidity environments. This moisture can be released upon heating at 120°C for extended periods of time. This makes it reusable multiple times with very little, if any, loss of efficiency.

Regeneration 
Some types of silica gel will "pop" when exposed to enough water. This is caused by breakage of the silica spheres when contacting the water.

Preparation 
An aqueous solution of sodium silicate is acidified to produce a gelatinous precipitate that is washed, then dehydrated to produce colorless silica gel. When a visible indication of the moisture content of the silica gel is required, ammonium tetrachlorocobaltate(II) (NH4)2[CoCl4] or cobalt(II) chloride CoCl2 is added. This will cause the gel to be blue when dry and pink when hydrated. Due to link between the cancer and cobalt chloride, it has been forbidden in Europe for use in silica gel. An alternative indicator is methyl violet which is orange when dry and green when hydrated.

Uses

Desiccant 

In many items, moisture encourages the growth of mold and spoilage. Condensation may also damage other items such as electronics and may speed the decomposition of chemicals, such as those in vitamin pills.  Through the inclusion of silica gel packets, these items can be preserved longer. It may aid the drying out of electronic equipment during attempts to restore items that have been exposed to moisture accidentally.

Silica gel may also be used to keep the relative humidity inside a high frequency radio or satellite transmission system waveguide as low as possible (see also humidity buffering). Excessive moisture buildup within a waveguide can cause arcing inside the waveguide itself, damaging the power amplifier feeding it. Also, the beads of water that form and condense inside the waveguide change the characteristic impedance and frequency, degrading the signal. It is common for a small compressed air system (similar to a small home aquarium pump) to be employed to circulate the air inside the waveguide over a jar of silica gel.

Silica gel can adsorb about 40 percent of its weight in moisture and can take the relative humidity in a closed container down to about 40 percent. Once saturated, you can propel the moisture off and reuse silica gel by heating it above 300 degrees F (150 C).

Silica gel is also used to dry the air in industrial compressed air systems. Air from the compressor discharge flows through a bed of silica gel beads. The silica gel adsorbs moisture from the air, preventing damage at the point of use of the compressed air due to condensation or moisture. The same system is used to dry the compressed air on railway locomotives, where condensation and ice in the brake air pipes can lead to brake failure.

Prior to widespread use of air-conditioning, salt shakers with caps containing silica gel beads to keep the salt dry enough to prevent clumping were marketed in the USA, replacing the practice of including a few grains of rice in salt shakers to effect the same drying.

Silica gel is sometimes used as a preservation tool to control relative humidity in museum and library exhibitions and storage.

Other applications include diagnostic test strips, inhalation devices, syringes, drug test kits, and hospital sanitation kits.

Chemistry 

In chemistry, silica gel is used in chromatography as a stationary phase. In column chromatography, the stationary phase is most often composed of silica gel particles of 40–63 μm. Different particle sizes are used for different kinds of column chromatography as the particle size is related to surface area. The differences in particle size dictate if the silica gel should be used for flash or gravity chromatography. In this application, due to silica gel's polarity, non-polar components tend to elute before more polar ones, hence the name normal phase chromatography. However, when hydrophobic groups (such as C18 groups) are attached to the silica gel then polar components elute first and the method is referred to as reverse phase chromatography. Silica gel is also applied to aluminium, glass, or plastic sheets for thin layer chromatography.

The hydroxy (OH) groups on the surface of silica can be functionalized to afford specialty silica gels that exhibit unique stationary phase parameters. These so-called functionalized silica gels are also used in organic synthesis and purification as insoluble reagents and scavengers.

Chelating groups have also been covalently bound to silica gel. These materials have the ability to remove metal ions selectively from aqueous solutions. Chelating groups can be covalently bound to polyamines that have been grafted onto a silica gel surface producing a material of greater mechanical integrity. Silica gel is also combined with alkali metals to form a M-SG reducing agent. (See SiGNa chemistry)

Silica gel is not expected to biodegrade in either water or soil.

Cat litter 
Silica gel is also used as cat litter, by itself or in combination with more traditional materials, such as clays including bentonite. It is non-tracking and virtually odorless.

Food additive 
Silica gel, also referred to as silicon dioxide or synthetic amorphous silica (SAS), is listed by the FDA in the United States as generally recognized as safe (GRAS), meaning it can be added to food products without needing approval. Silica is allowed to be added to food in the USA at up to 2% as permitted under 21 CFR 172.480. In the EU, it can be in up to 5% concentrations. In 2018, a re-evaluation by the EFSA Panel on Food Additives and Nutrient Sources added to Food found no indications of toxicity even at the highest estimates of exposure level.

Listed uses include: anticaking agent, defoaming agent, stabilizer, adsorbent, carrier, conditioning agent, chillproofing agent, filter aid, emulsifying agent, viscosity control agent, and anti-settling agent. Silica can be found commonly in foods including baked goods, spices and herbs, dairy products, cocoa products, and more.

Water filtration 
Given the water adsorption properties of silica gel, it is used in domestic water filters. The surface structure of silica gel allows the adsorption of some minerals that are dissolved in the water, or "Ion-exchange" as it is marketed. Due to the lack of regulations for domestic water filtration products, no studies validate the manufacturer claims regarding the effectiveness of the filtration system.

Humidity indicator (color-changing silica gel) 

Silica gel may be doped with a moisture indicator that gradually changes its color when it transitions from the anhydrous (dry) state to the hydrated (wet) state. Common indicators are cobalt(II) chloride and methyl violet. Cobalt (II) chloride is deep blue when dry and pink when wet, but it is toxic and carcinogenic, and was reclassified by the European Union in July 2000 as a toxic material. Methyl violet may be formulated to change from orange to green, or orange to colorless. It also is toxic and potentially carcinogenic, but is safe enough to have medicinal uses. A more ecologically friendly indicator solution is ferric ammonium sulfate, which results in a color change from deep orange/amber when dry to colorless/white when saturated.

Hazards 
Silica gel is non-toxic, non-flammable, and non-reactive and stable with ordinary usage. It will react with hydrogen fluoride, fluorine, oxygen difluoride, chlorine trifluoride, strong acids, strong bases, and oxidizers. Silica gel is irritating to the respiratory tract and may cause irritation of the digestive tract. Dust from the beads may cause irritation to the skin and eyes, so precautions should be taken. Crystalline silica dust can cause silicosis, but synthetic amorphous silica gel is indurated so does not cause silicosis. Additional hazards may occur when doped with a humidity indicator.

References

External links 

 
 UK Material Safety Datasheet
 Silica Gel with Moisture indicator: Instructions for Use Detailed use and re-drying info (broken link?)
 Silica Gel Dehumidifier FAQs Helpful Information on Rechargeable Silica Packs for Home Usage
 Silica-bound reagents Information on development and Tables illustrating reactivity
 Silica-bound scavengers General notes and Tables that summarize scavenging capacity

Desiccants
Gels
Glass types
American inventions
Silicon dioxide
Conservation and restoration materials